105 Squadron is a territorial reserve squadron of the South African Air Force.  The squadron operations include coastal reconnaissance, command and control and radio relay in crime prevention operations in co-operation with the South African Police and Army.  The squadron is based at AFB Durban.  These reserve squadrons are used to fill a pilot and aircraft gap within the SAAF by making use of civilian pilots and their privately owned aircraft.  Most flying takes place over weekends and because pilots have a good knowledge of the local terrain in the area where they live and commonly fly, the squadron is mostly used in a crime prevention role.

References

Squadrons of the South African Air Force
Military units and formations in Durban
Territorial Reserve Squadrons of the South African Air Force